This is a comparison of various properties of different display technologies.

General characteristics 

Major technologies are CRT, LCD and its derivatives (Quantum dot display, LED backlit LCD, WLCD, OLCD), Plasma, and OLED and its derivatives (Transparent OLED, PMOLED, AMOLED). An emerging technology is Micro LED and cancelled and now obsolete technologies are SED and FED.

Temporal characteristics 
Different display technologies have vastly different temporal characteristics, leading to perceptual differences for motion, flicker, etc.

The figure shows a sketch of how different technologies present a single white/grey frame. Time and intensity is not to scale. Notice that some have a fixed intensity, while the illuminated period is variable. This is a kind of pulse-width modulation. Others can vary the actual intensity in response to the input signal.

Single-chip DLPs use a kind of "chromatic multiplexing" in which each color is presented serially. The intensity is varied by modulating the "on" time of each pixel within the time-span of one color. Multi-chip DLPs are not represented in this sketch, but would have a curve identical to the plasma display.
LCDs have a constant (backlit) image, where the intensity is varied by blocking the light shining through the panel.
CRTs use an electron beam, scanning the display, flashing a lit image. If interlacing is used, a single full-resolution image results in two "flashes". The physical properties of the phosphor are responsible for the rise and decay curves.
Plasma displays modulate the "on" time of each sub-pixel, similar to DLP.
Movie theaters use a mechanical shutter to illuminate the same frame 2 or 3 times, increasing the flicker frequency to make it less perceptible to the human eye.

Research 
Researchers announced a display that uses silicon metasurface pixels that do not require polarized light and require half the energy. It employs a transparent conductive oxide as a heater that can quickly change the pixels. The pixels are 100 times thinner than liquid crystal. Response times are under 1 millisecond. They laim that the metasurface array could replace the liquid crystal layer in today's displays, eliminating the need for production technology.

See also 
 Computer monitor
 Large-screen television technology

References 

Display technology
Display technology